Twisted Tales is an Australian television anthology and mystery drama which screened on the Nine Network from December 1996 to January 1998. Each episode was narrated by Bryan Brown, who also produced the follow-up series, Two Twisted, in 2006.  Each episode of the series contains a twist ending.

Release
The series initially aired during December 1996 and January 1997, before going on hiatus. Later in 1997, a video titled Still Twisted was made for the Australian and American markets. It compiled various episodes from the series into a single movie.

The show briefly returned to Australian television in early 1998.

Episode list
<onlyinclude>

See also 
 List of Australian television series
 List of Nine Network programs

References

External links
 
Twisted Tales at the National Film and Sound Archive

Australian anthology television series
Australian drama television series
Nine Network original programming
1996 Australian television series debuts
1998 Australian television series endings